Bayrak is a Turkish-language surname. It may refer to:
 Mithat Bayrak (1929–2014), Turkish sports wrestler and trainer
 Özge Bayrak (born 1992), Turkish female badminton player
 Sedat Bayrak (born 1981), Turkish footballer 
 Serdar Bayrak (born 1985), Turkish footballer 
 Tosun Bayrak (1926–2018), Turkish writer
 Vitaliy Bayrak (1907–1946), Ukrainian priest and martyr

Turkish-language surnames